Lusici may refer to:

 , which settled in Lusatia (now in Germany/Poland)
 Lusići, a village in Bosnia-Herzegovina